is a Japanese politician currently serving as the Governor of Osaka Prefecture. He assumed office in April 2019. He has been described as a conservative.

Early life 
Yoshimura was born in the Osaka suburb of Kawachinagano. He studied law at Kyushu University, graduating in 1998. He passed the Japanese bar examination later that year and was admitted to practice as an attorney in 2000, at the age of 25.

After working for several years under Tokyo-based attorney Shintaro Kumagai (熊谷 信太郎), Yoshimura returned to Osaka and co-founded the Star Law Office in 2005. He remains a partner in the firm as of 2017.

Political career

Osaka City Council 
Yoshimura was elected to the Osaka city council in 2011 as a member of the Osaka Restoration Association headed by Osaka Prefecture governor Toru Hashimoto.

House of Representatives 
Yoshimura was elected to the Japanese House of Representatives in the 2014 general election as a member of the Japan Innovation Party. He was a candidate in the Osaka 4th district and lost in a close race with LDP incumbent Yasuhide Nakayama, but picked up a seat through the JIP proportional representation list.

Yoshimura's tenure in the Diet was short. Following an unsuccessful referendum in May 2015 to restructure the Osaka government, Toru Hashimoto announced his resignation as mayor of Osaka. In October, Hashimoto announced that he would transform the Osaka Restoration Association into a national party with about a dozen Diet members who had broken away from the JIP. On the same day, Yoshimura resigned from the House to run in the November 2015 election to replace Hashimoto. Hashimoto reportedly hand-picked Yoshimura to serve as his successor.

Mayor of Osaka 
Yoshimura was initially considered an underdog in his mayoral bid in the November 2015 "double election" for the governor of Osaka Prefecture and mayor of Osaka City. However, he won the election by a wide margin with former mayor Hashimoto's support. In the final tally, he won 596,045 votes versus 406,595 for runner-up Akira Yanagimoto, who was supported by Prime Minister Shinzo Abe and the LDP. Yoshimura took office on 18 December 2015.

At the beginning of his term, Yoshimura joined with the newly elected Osaka Prefecture governor Ichiro Matsui to establish a joint office for the purpose of promoting Osaka as a "vice capital" of Japan, such as by hosting government agencies currently based in Tokyo.

Yoshimura is a proponent of casino development in Osaka, and led a 2017 proposal to re-develop part of the Yumenoshima artificial island in Osaka Bay as a casino facility.

In 2017, Yoshimura threatened to cancel Osaka's sister city relationship with San Francisco due to plans from a Chinese-American group to incorporate a statue of a comfort woman in a San Francisco municipal park. In October 2018, he officially terminated Osaka's sister city relationship with San Francisco. He resigned from the post on 21 March 2019 to contest the Osaka Gubernatorial Election.

Governor of Osaka

Yoshimura won the Osaka gubernatorial election held in 2019. He was backed by Osaka Ishin. His opponent, Tadakazu Konishi, was backed by the Liberal Democratic Party and Komeito.

References 

1975 births
Living people
Japanese politicians
Kyushu University alumni
Mayors of Osaka
Japanese municipal councilors
Politicians from Osaka Prefecture
People from Yokohama
People from Kawachinagano
Historical revisionism